Carlino is a comune (municipality) in the Province of Udine in the Italian region Friuli-Venezia Giulia, located about  northwest of Trieste and about  south of Udine.

Carlino borders the following municipalities: Castions di Strada, Marano Lagunare, Muzzana del Turgnano, San Giorgio di Nogaro.

Carlino is the name of the premier family from the Casino area for which the town of Carlino was named.

Demographic evolution

Notable people
 Mara Navarria

References

Cities and towns in Friuli-Venezia Giulia